Catherine "Cathy" Buckle is a writer and blogger, born 1957, in Southern Rhodesia. Having resided in Zimbabwe her entire life, Buckle is currently living in Marondera, Zimbabwe.

Biography 

Buckle is a single mother living in rural Zimbabwe. Buckle graduated from the University of Rhodesia in 1979, having originally trained as a social worker. 

Her blog, "Letters from Zimbabwe", includes print, photos, personal entries, and broadcast media outlets. She writes stories about wildlife, conservation, flora, and fauna of her country. She is passionate about sharing the beauty of Zimbabwe.

Writings 
Buckle has written four children's books; one of which was selected as a set book for in Zimbabwean senior schools for English literature students in 2017. 

One of her memoirs, African Tears, chronicles the personal story of the government approved invasion of her farm bought after Zimbabwean independence. African Tears was serialized in The Sunday Times, Femina magazine and Rapport newspaper.

In the book, Innocent Victims – Rescuing the stranded animals of Zimbabwe’s farm invasions, Buckle informs readers of Zimbabwe Society for the Prevention of Cruelty to Animals's rescues of animals during the farm invasions. 

Within the regular e-mail blog, Letter from Zimbabwe, readers can be informed of the cruelty to animals during land invasions as well as the efforts in bringing perpetrators to justice.

Bibliography 

 African Tears. The Zimbabwe Land Invasions.  (2001)
Beyond Tears. Zimbabwe's tragedy. (2002)
Innocent Victims – Rescuing the stranded animals of Zimbabwe’s farm invasions. (2009)
Imire. The Life and Times of Norman Travers.  (2010)
Can you Hear the Drums.  Letters from Zimbabwe 2000 - 2004. (2013)
 Millions, Billions, Trillions. Letters from Zimbabwe 2005 - 2009.  (2014)
 Sleeping Like A Hare (2015)
Rundi.  Hand Rearing baby Elephants. (2016)
When Winners are Losers Letters from Zimbabwe 2009 - 2013. (2018)
Finding Our Voices Letters from Zimbabwe 2013 - 2017.  (2018)
 Surviving Zimbabwe (2020)

References

External links

1957 births
White Rhodesian people
Rhodesian people of British descent
Zimbabwean women farmers
Zimbabwean non-fiction writers
People from Harare
Living people
Zimbabwean women children's writers
20th-century Zimbabwean women writers
21st-century Zimbabwean women writers
University of Zimbabwe alumni